Bashkir rebellion may refer to:

Bashkir rebellion of 1662–1664
Bashkir rebellion of 1681–1684
Bashkir rebellion of 1704–1711
Bashkir rebellion of 1735–1740